San Jorge, officially the Municipality of San Jorge, is a 4th class municipality in the province of Samar, Philippines. According to the 2020 census, it has a population of 17,579 people.

The town is famous for its Blanca Aurora Falls near Barangay Blanca Aurora along the Blanca Aurora river. On December 6, 1978, Pagsanghan and San Jorge were created as a new municipalities out of Gandara. An inauguration is held every 10 October since 1979.

Due to farming abundancy here in San Jorge, they proclaimed Saint George as their Patron Saint and because it happened that the name were similar to a historical person named George Curn.

History
The community is one of the oldest baraŋgay of municipality of Gandara. Its history can be traced back to the American regime. Even its name San Jorge was in honor of an American soldier by the name of George Curn who happened to own and donate the site where the old baraŋgay was formerly located. The present location is the second site of the baraŋgay. Its old site was located across the Sapinit River where the San Jorge Elementary School is presently nestled.

Geography

Barangays
San Jorge is divided into 41 barangays according to the Assessors Office of the Town, the towns MAP.

Climate

Flooding and erosion potential
Two mountainside slope rolling down to the San Jorge National High School and a Gasoline Station were observed to be a potential flood prone areas, developer and planning engineers constructed a Rectangular Culvert alongside the 1 AH 26 Sleeves going to the San Jorge River.
With a vast water shed area just below the municipality of San Jose de Buan, San Jorge area is really a drainage area in times of rainy season. In a matter of two consecutive days rain, flood waters automatically rumbles down the slopes going to the lowland areas from Buenavista, Bulao, La Paz, Mombon, San Jorge Proper, Erenas then directly towards the low-lying areas of the town of Gandara then to the town of Pagsanghan and the samar sea finally. Areas like the barangays of Buenavista, Janipon,Bulao, Guindapunan, La Paz, Mombon, and Anquiana could be soaked for a couple of days which usually leads to destruction of standing crops in the lowlands. These are usually rice, corn, vegetables and other crops in the flat lands.

Demographics

Education

SNAS (Samar National Agricultural School)

Old Campus (Matalud)

New Campus (Erenas)

Laboratory High School

San Jorge Central Elementary School

San Jorge National High School

Economy

Infrastructure
Water Systems Japan International Coordination Agency (JICA) constructed a water systems on this town, the source of water was on Tomogbong (284 meters above MeanSeaLevel), there is a Distilled Water Spring uphill the Atigbang proper. The pipelines runs to the town Proper above then Mayor Cristeta Racuyal Corrales a Concrete Reservoir and distribute it back to the barrios. Saint George elevation is 272 meters below Tomogbong (Reference Elevation 1), there is a proposed pipelines that will run from Town Proper to Atigbang Sapinit, Rosalim, Aurora and County 27 November; at Sapinit Primary School elevation is 257 meters below Ref.Point, at Near San Jorge Cemetery elevation is 250 meters below Reference Point 1, approaching Mabuhay elevation higher than passed barrios is elevation 241 meters below Ref. Point 1, at 1 AH (Asian Highway) 26 kilometer Post 777 elevation is 216 meters below Ref. POint and approaching Quezon is 67 meters above MSL.

There is another planned development and business of the Town of Saint George, it is by supplying the town of Gandera a potable water, the highest elevation that will encounter is 268 meters below Tomogbong and 6 Kilometers distance pipelines.

Solid Waste Management A Garbage truck collects the garbage of the town, it is dumped in the common dumping area in Hinogacan, Gandara, Samar.

Department of Agriculture (Bio&Seed Farm)

LaPaz Agricultural micro-Bridge

LaPaz-Puhagan Dam and Irrigation Canals

Blanca Farm-to-Market Road Bridge

References

External links
 San Jorge Profile at PhilAtlas.com
 [ Philippine Standard Geographic Code]
 Philippine Census Information
 Local Governance Performance Management System

Municipalities of Samar (province)